Fox Music was the music division label of 20th Century Fox. It encompassed music publishing and licensing businesses, dealing primarily with television and film soundtracks. It was located in Century City, California.

During CEO Robert Kraft's tenure at Fox, dozens of Fox scores and soundtracks have become platinum or gold records. Highlights include the soundtracks from 20th Century Fox and Fox Searchlight Pictures films such as Titanic, Waiting to Exhale, 28 Weeks Later, Moulin Rouge!, Garden State, Romeo + Juliet, The Full Monty, Hope Floats, Dr. Dolittle, Bulworth, Anastasia, Walk the Line, the 1st Alvin and the Chipmunks film, Once, and Juno.

Fox Music has also supervised the music for 20th Century Fox Television hits such as Ally McBeal and The X-Files, as well shows Family Guy and The Simpsons. Since 1994, television soundtracks from Fox Music have included the worldwide platinum albums from "Ally McBeal" and "X-Files", plus hit compilations from King of the Hill, Buffy the Vampire Slayer, Dark Angel, The Simpsons, Roswell and 24.

Since Kraft became chief executive in 1994, Fox Music has been responsible for the worldwide sales of over 60 million albums, producing 3 Platinum, 6 Multi-Platinum and 6 Gold records. Fox Music has garnered 10 Academy Award nominations, winning 4 Academy Awards, 14 Golden Globe nominations (including 4 Golden Globe Awards), 58 Emmy nominations with 11 wins, and 46 Grammy nominations including 12 Grammy Awards.

Fox Music used to utilize unaffiliated record companies for distribution.  For example, Glee Cast albums were released by Columbia Records. Such recordings were released under the 20th Century Fox TV Records imprint which was introduced in 2009 as a joint venture of 20th Century Fox and Sony Music.

Following the Disney-Fox merger in 2019, Fox Music became part of Disney Music Group and distributed by Universal Music Group, which under DMG's Hollywood Records label. In 2020, due to Disney dropping the "Fox" brand, Fox Music was folded into Hollywood Records. Now, Fox Music is only used as a legal name for 20th Century Studios' soundtrack labels before Disney's acquisition.

References 

20th Century Studios
Hollywood Records
Labels distributed by Universal Music Group
Entertainment companies based in California
Music publishing companies of the United States
American record labels
Record labels established in 1992
Record labels disestablished in 2020
Soundtrack record labels
Entertainment companies established in 1992
Entertainment companies disestablished in 2020
Companies based in Los Angeles
1992 establishments in California
2020 disestablishments in California
Former News Corporation subsidiaries